This article lists events that occurred during 1961 in Estonia.

Incumbents

Events
1 December – Tallinn Botanic Garden was established.
Construction of Õismäe (subdivision of Tallinn) starts. Construction is ended 1973.

Births
22 April - Alo Mattiisen, composer
2 October - Jaan Toomik, video artist, painter, and filmmaker

Deaths
14 January - Herman Aav, head of Finnish Orthodox Church
4 April - Harald Riipalu, commander in the German Wehrmacht and the Waffen-SS during World War II
20 April - Ado Vabbe, painter
14 September - Ernst Gustav Kühnert, architect and art historian

References

 
1960s in Estonia
Estonia
Estonia
Years of the 20th century in Estonia